Old East Boston High School (also known as Joseph H. Barnes School) is an historic school building at 127 Marion Street in East Boston, Massachusetts.  It now acts as Section 8 housing for elderly or disabled people.

This building is currently under consideration for Boston Landmark status by the Boston Landmarks Commission.

The Renaissance style school was built in 1901 to a design by John Lyman Faxon and expanded in 1933 to a design by Charles R. Greco.  It is a three-story structure, faced in yellow brick and limestone, with a flat roof and a raised basement.  It is roughly in the shape of an H, with a central section that has side wings projecting to both the front and rear.  A circular auditorium section stands behind the central section.

The building was added to the National Register of Historic Places in 2006.

See also
National Register of Historic Places listings in northern Boston, Massachusetts

References

School buildings on the National Register of Historic Places in Massachusetts
School buildings completed in 1901
East Boston
National Register of Historic Places in Boston
1901 establishments in Massachusetts